Suche may refer to the following places:
Suché, a village and municipality in Slovakia
Suche, Lesser Poland Voivodeship (south Poland)
Suche, Masovian Voivodeship (east-central Poland)